The Everlasting Secret Family is a 1988 Australian film directed by Michael Thornhill about a secret society of gay men.  It was based on Frank Moorhouse's so-named collection of four short stories published in 1980.

The movie was financed by Antony I. Ginnane's IFM company.

IFM pre-sold the movie to Hemdale Film Corporation for $1.5 million but Hemdale was later unable to meet its pre-sale obligations.

Plot
A fictional group of middle-aged homosexual men, including a senator, exercise quasi-masonic influence and power over teenage schoolboys from the fictional Saint Michael's Private School for Boys. The film follows one of these boys (called only 'Youth'), as he rises through the ranks of the secret society.

Cast
 Mark Lee as Youth
 John Meillon as Judge
 Drew Norman as Oil Boy
 Dennis Miller as Eric, the Chauffeur
 Arthur Dignam as Senator
 Alan Carey as Doctor at Oval
 Ken Keen as Headmaster
 Marcus Cornelius as Teacher at Oval
 Heather Mitchell as Wife
 Michael Winchester as School Teacher
 Louis Nowra as Shop Assistant
 Dominic Barry as Bell Captain
 Paul Davies as Waiter #1
 Allan Penney as Gardener
 Victor Ramon as Maitre'd #1
 Michael Kozuki as Mr. Akutangana
 Anna Volska as Wife's Friend
 Paul Goddard as Son

Reviews
Janet Maslin of The New York Times in 1989 thought that the film was divided "into two-halves, the first engrossing and the second ridiculous....The action becomes farfetched, the actors hopelessly unconvincing, and everyone ages so badly—thanks to too much eyebrow pencil and talcum powder—that the film winds up looking like a high-school play".

RS reviewing for Time Out stated that "All the gay characters are 'elderly pervert' stereotypes, cruel, calculating and vampirish. Yet, for a film that takes so rigidly homophobic a stance, an awful lot of time is spent dwelling on youthful tanned muscles and taut buttocks".

References

External links
 
 
 The Everlasting Secret Family at Oz Movies

1988 films
1988 LGBT-related films
Australian LGBT-related films
Works by Frank Moorhouse
1980s English-language films
Films directed by Michael Thornhill